Arturo Chávez Korfiatis (born 12 January 1990) is a Peruvian athlete specialising in the high jump. He represented his country at the 2016 Summer Olympics without qualifying for the final.

His personal best in the event is 2.31 metres set in Mexico City in 2016.

International competitions

References

1990 births
Living people
Peruvian male high jumpers
Athletes (track and field) at the 2011 Pan American Games
Athletes (track and field) at the 2019 Pan American Games
Pan American Games competitors for Peru
Athletes (track and field) at the 2016 Summer Olympics
Olympic athletes of Peru
Athletes (track and field) at the 2018 South American Games
South American Games silver medalists for Peru
South American Games medalists in athletics
21st-century Peruvian people